Dame Mary Dora Daly,  ( MacMahon; 24 August 189611 June 1983) was an Australian writer, humanitarian and charity worker.

Biography
Mary Dora MacMahon was born in Cootamundra, New South Wales, 24 August 1896. Her parents were Thomas Patrick MacMahon, a solicitor, and his wife Mary Ellen (née O'Donnell). She was educated at Loreto convent schools in Normanhurst, New South Wales and Ballarat, Victoria.

On 3 January 1923, at St Canice's Church, Darlinghurst, she married John Joseph Daly (died 1953), a physician and a nephew of the founder of St Vincent's Hospital, Mother Berchmans Daly. The Dalys had two children, John and Marie.

With the outbreak of World War II, Daly was the only woman on the executive of the Catholic Welfare Organisation, founded in Melbourne in 1939 by Archbishop Mannix. She became the CWO's president two years later, in 1941.

She was also affiliated with: 
 Member, National Council, Australian Red Cross Society (ARCS)
 Executive Member, Council of the Victorian Division, ARCS
 Fund-raiser, Caritas Christi Hospice
 First woman president (1966–75), Australian Catholic Relief
 Foundation member (president 1975–77), Ryder-Cheshire Foundation (Australia).

Writings
Cinty and the laughing jackasses and other children's stories (1961) 
Timmy's Christmas surprise (1967) 
Holidays at Hillydale: a story for children about a family's holiday spent on an Australian sheep station (1973) 
Catholic Welfare Organisation: its work for the men and women of the Services during World War II, September 1939 - June 1948

Death
Dame Mary Daly died at Fitzroy, Victoria, aged 86, on 11 June 1983.

Honours and awards
King George V Silver Jubilee Medal - 1935.
Officer of the Order of the British Empire (OBE) - 1937
Commander of the Order of the British Empire (CBE) - 1949
Dame Commander of the Order of the British Empire (DBE) - 1951
 The Roman Catholic Church awarded Mary Daly the Cross Pro Ecclesia et Pontifice in 1951, in honour of her work as president of the Catholic Welfare Organization of Victoria.
 Long service medal from the Australian Red Cross Society in 1940 and honorary life membership in 1971.

References

Sources
 Lofthouse, Andrea (ed.), Who's Who of Australian Women, Methuen Australia, North Ryde (NSW), 1982

1896 births
1983 deaths
Australian Roman Catholics
Australian people of Irish descent
Australian Dames Commander of the Order of the British Empire
People from New South Wales
Writers from Melbourne
Australian humanitarians
Women humanitarians
Australian children's writers
Australian women children's writers